Mina Tander (born 4 December 1978) is a German actress. She played BfV agent Esther Krug on Berlin Station from 2016 to 2019.

Biography
Born in Cologne, Tander is the daughter of an Afghan journalist father, who died when she was a child, and a German teacher mother.

She was raised in Cologne with her older sister Simin Tander.

Tander is married to German film director Elmar Fischer. He directed Tander in his 2003 film Fremder Freund (Strange Friend), and in the 2009 episode "Die Kronzeugin" of Der Kriminalist (The Criminalist).

Selected filmography

Accolades
 2009: Nomination – German Film Critics Award for Best Actress for Wedding Fever in Campobello (Maria, ihm schmeckt's nicht)
 2014: Nomination – Jupiter Award for Best German Actress for Buddy
 2017: Win – Jupiter Award for Best German Actress for Seitenwechsel

References

External links
 

1978 births
German film actresses
German television actresses
Living people
Actors from Cologne
German people of Afghan descent